There are two places called Hillsborough in New Zealand:
Hillsborough, Auckland, a suburb of Auckland
Hillsborough, Canterbury, a suburb of Christchurch